Zeeshan Ashraf Qasmi (born 28 February 1977 in Quetta, Pakistan) is a field hockey full back. He made his international debut for Pakistan in 2001, and competed in the 2006 Commonwealth Games.

Career
He served as Captain of the Pakistan national field hockey team for the 2008 Summer Olympics in Beijing, and the 2010 Hockey World Cup in India. In the latter tournament, Pakistan finished 12th of 12th, after which Ashraf announced that all players on the team, himself included, would retire.

See also
Pakistan national field hockey team

References

External links
 
 Pakistan Hockey Team

1977 births
Living people
Olympic field hockey players of Pakistan
Pakistani male field hockey players
Male field hockey defenders
Field hockey players at the 2004 Summer Olympics
Field hockey players at the 2008 Summer Olympics
Field hockey players at the 2006 Commonwealth Games
Field hockey players at the 2010 Commonwealth Games
Commonwealth Games silver medallists for Pakistan
2006 Men's Hockey World Cup players
2010 Men's Hockey World Cup players
World Series Hockey players
People from Quetta
Asian Games medalists in field hockey
Field hockey players at the 2002 Asian Games
Field hockey players at the 2006 Asian Games
Field hockey players at the 2010 Asian Games
Commonwealth Games bronze medallists for Pakistan
Commonwealth Games medallists in field hockey
Asian Games gold medalists for Pakistan
Asian Games bronze medalists for Pakistan
Medalists at the 2006 Asian Games
Medalists at the 2010 Asian Games
Medallists at the 2006 Commonwealth Games